The Public Suffix List (PSL) is a catalog of certain Internet domain names. Entries on the list are also referred to as effective top-level domains (eTLD).
The Mozilla Foundation initiated the suffix list for the security and privacy policies of its Firefox web browser, but it is widely applied, with varying success, to a variety of other purposes under the Mozilla Public License (MPL).

List
The list is used by Mozilla browsers (Firefox), by Google in Chrome and Chromium projects on certain platforms, and by Opera.

According to Mozilla,

While com, uk, and us are top-level domains (TLDs), Internet users cannot always register the next level of domain, such as "co.uk" or "wy.us", because these may be controlled by domain registrars. By contrast, users can register second level domains within com, such as example.com, because registrars control only the top level. The Public Suffix List is intended to enumerate all domain suffixes controlled by registrars.

An internet site consists of the online resources which can be controlled by the registrant of a domain name. That includes resources available via the domain and all its sub-domains. Two domains are related if they are in the same site, i.e. they share a suffix that is not included in the Public Suffix List.

Security issues like a same-site attack can arise if the Public Suffix List is incorrect, or if browsers or sites are not properly configured.

Some uses for the list are:
 Avoiding "supercookies", HTTP cookies set by related-domain attackers for high-level domain name suffixes. In other words, a page at foo.example.co.uk might normally have access to cookies at bar.example2.co.uk, but example.co.uk should be walled off from cookies at example2.co.uk, to prevent a same-site attack, since the latter two domains could be registered by different owners.
 Finding DMARC policy records for email subdomains.
 Highlighting the most important part of a domain name in the user interface.
 Improving the sorting of browser history entries by site.

Issues 
The PSL has been seen as a tool for a variety of goals related to security, privacy, usability and resource management which can be in tension with each other, leading to maintenance difficulties and operational challenges. Ideas for effective approaches such as dbound, HTTP Stake Tokens and First Party Sets have been explored without consensus yet on good alternatives.

In 2021, privacy enhancements in iOS 14.5 related to Apple's Identifier for Advertisers and unclear guidance from Facebook led to a flood of inappropriate requests for domains to be added to the Public Suffix List.

References

External links

Domain Name System
Mozilla